Elections for Cotswold District Council were held on Thursday 5 May 2011. The whole council was up for election. Cotswold District is divided into 28 wards, with a total of 44 seats up for election.

Summary results
The Conservatives lost 12 seats, 7 to the Liberal Democrats and 5 to Independents.

Wards

2011 English local elections
Cotswold District Council elections
2010s in the Cotswolds